Haruna Maitala (died 2 April 2021) was a Nigerian politician. He was member of the House of Representatives for the Jos North/Bassa Constituency, as a member of the All Progressives Congress.

In 2021, he was killed in a car accident on his way from Abuja to Jos. He died alongside his son and two others. He was replaced in a by-election by Musa Agah Avia.

See also 

 List of members of the House of Representatives of Nigeria, 2019–2023

References 

20th-century births
2021 deaths
All Progressives Congress politicians
21st-century Nigerian politicians
Road incident deaths in Nigeria
People from Jos
Members of the House of Representatives (Nigeria)